Neotheoridae, or Amazonian primitive ghost moths, is a primitive family of insects in the lepidopteran order containing a single genus and species, Neotheora chiloides.

Distribution
Neotheora chiloides is known from a single female collected in Mato Grosso, Brazil (Kristensen, 1999: 60; Nielsen et al., 2000).

References

Kristensen, N.P., (1999). The non-Glossatan Moths. Ch. 4, pp. 41–62  in Kristensen, N.P. (Ed.). Lepidoptera, Moths and Butterflies. Volume 1: Evolution, Systematics, and Biogeography. Handbuch der Zoologie. Eine Naturgeschichte der Stämme des Tierreiches / Handbook of Zoology. A Natural History of the phyla of the Animal Kingdom. Band / Volume IV Arthropoda: Insecta Teilband / Part 35: 491 pp. Walter de Gruyter, Berlin, New York.
Nielsen, E.S., Robinson, G.S. and Wagner, D.L. 2000. Ghost-moths of the world: a global inventory and bibliography of the Exoporia (Mnesarchaeoidea and Hepialoidea) (Lepidoptera) Journal of Natural History, 34(6): 823-878.Abstract

Sources
Common Name Index

External links
Tree of Life
Wikispecies
Mikko's Phylogeny Archive

Hepialoidea
Monotypic moth genera
Exoporia genera
Moths of South America